Palaeoperca is an extinct genus of prehistoric bony fish that lived from the early to middle Eocene. Fossils were found in the Messel pit.

References

Serranidae
Eocene fish
Cenozoic animals of Europe
Fossil taxa described in 1978